Work of Heart is the self-produced fourth studio album of South African singer-songwriter and record producer Zonke. Released on 11 September 2015 through Sony Entertainment Africa., it is the follow up of her gold-certified live album Give and Take Live.

Background
On 23 August 2015, Zonke announced the release date, pre-order link, track listing and cover art of the album. Preceding the album's release were two singles titled "Reach It" and "Meet Me in My Dreams", the later a song she dedicated to her older sister Lulu Dikana. Work of Heart was nominated in two categories at the 15th Metro FM Music Awards and four categories at the 22nd South African Music Awards, winning one.

Commercial performance
On 15 July 2016, the album was certified platinum.

Critical reception
Upon its release, Work of Heart was met to positive critical reviews among local music critics. Lesley Mofokeng of SowetanLIVE gave the overall album production and songs an excellent verdict but however suggested that Zonke should experiment infusing some other genres of music in her upcoming projects. Lebogang Boshomane, a music critic for SowetanLIVE gave the album 3.9 stars out of 5, further stating that, "All in all, it is a good album which will have you tearing up one moment then slowly moving to the beat the next".

Track listing

Release history

Accolades

References

Zonke albums
2015 albums